Leonard Ravenhill (18 June 1907 – 27 November 1994) was an English Christian evangelist and author who focused on the subjects of prayer and revival. He is best known for challenging western evangelicalism (through his books and sermons) to compare itself to the early Christian Church as chronicled in the Book of Acts. His most notable book is Why Revival Tarries which has sold over a million copies worldwide.

Biography
Born in Leeds, in Yorkshire, England, on 18 June 1907, Ravenhill was educated at Cliff College in England and sat under the ministry of Samuel Chadwick.  He was a student of church history, with a particular interest in Christian revival. His evangelistic meetings during the Second World War drew large crowds. Many converts devoted themselves to Christian ministry and foreign missions.

In 1939, he married an Irish nurse, Martha (1912-2001). The Ravenhills had three sons: Paul, David, and Philip. Paul and David are Christian ministers. Philip was in ministry for a while before moving on to specialize in African art history. Philip died of a heart attack in 1997.

In 1950, Ravenhill and his family moved from Great Britain to the United States. In the 1960s they travelled within the United States, holding tent revivals and evangelistic meetings.

In the 1980s, Ravenhill moved to a home near Lindale, Texas, a short distance from Last Days Ministries Ranch. He regularly taught classes at LDM and was a mentor to the late Keith Green. He also spent some time teaching at Bethany College of Missions in Minnesota and some time in Seguin, Texas.

Among others influenced by Ravenhill were Keith Green, Charles Stanley, Paul Washer, and David Wilkerson.

He was a close friend of pastor and writer A.W. Tozer as well as singer Keith Green.

Through his teaching and books, Ravenhill addressed the disparities he perceived between the New Testament Church and the Church in his time and called for adherence to the principles of biblical revival.

Tozer said of Ravenhill:
 "To such men as this, the church owes a debt too heavy to pay. The curious thing is that she seldom tries to pay him while he lives. Rather, the next generation builds his sepulchre and writes his biography – as if instinctively and awkwardly to discharge an obligation the previous generation to a large extent ignored."

Ravenhill died on 27 November 1994 and is interred at Garden Valley Cemetery in Garden Valley, Texas, near the grave of Contemporary Christian music artist Keith Green.

In 2011 Free Grace Press published a full biography of Leonard Ravenhill written by Mack Tomlinson titled, In Light of Eternity.

Works

References

External links

Leonard Ravenhill Official Website
Sermons of Leonard Ravenhill
Excerpt from Revival God's Way
Excerpt from Why Revival Tarries (from a book published in 1959)
Biographical Sketch by David Bercot
Leonard Ravenhill: A Man on Fire for God

1907 births
1994 deaths
20th-century British male writers
20th-century evangelicals
Arminian writers
British evangelists
British evangelicals
British expatriates in the United States
Evangelical writers
People from Lindale, Texas